Grey College is a college of Durham University in England. Although it was originally planned for the college to be named Oliver Cromwell College, this proved too controversial and it was instead named after Charles Grey, 2nd Earl Grey, who was prime minister at the time of the university's foundation.

History

Founded in 1959, Grey was the first college of the university's post-war expansion, and the second college to open on Elvet Hill after St Mary's. It was also the last college founded before the separation of Durham and Newcastle in 1963. The college initially only admitted men, but has been mixed since 1984.

In March 1959, just a few months before the opening of the college, the Elvet block (then the main block of the college) was devastated by fire. However, the college recovered to open as scheduled in October and adopted the phoenix as its unofficial badge. The college coat of arms features a scaling ladder (or gré—the badge of the Grey family) between two St Cuthbert's crosses (the symbol of Durham). A new grant of arms in 2004 confirmed these and added the phoenix as a crest.

Fountains Hall was completed in 1971 and the Lattin Chapel, named after former college bursar Frank Lattin, was consecrated on 18 November 1973 by the Bishop of Durham, John Habgood.

During the 1966 World Cup, Grey was home to the Soviet Union's football team who were playing their group matches in Sunderland and Middlesbrough. They won all their matches while based in Durham, but eventually lost to West Germany in the semi-finals.

Grey College was exclusively for male students until the start of the 1984–1985 academic year, when a contingent of nineteen women joined the college in their first year as a pilot programme. These first female members of the college had been assigned to Grey, rather than having chosen it, since they had not specified a college of residence at the time they had applied to the University of Durham. Few changes were made to accommodate the new mixed-sex living arrangements—toilet and bathroom facilities were shared, for instance. Female students could, however, request lace curtains in addition to the regular fabric curtains for their rooms.

In the following year, 1985–1986, Grey College opened its doors to all women, who could now actively apply to join the college. By the time these women had graduated three years later, Grey had become indistinguishable in population from the other mixed-sex colleges of the university.

In 1992 a plan to construct a fourth accommodation block was announced. This became Holgate House, named after the college's first matter, Sidney Holgate, and was opened in 1996. The Victor Watts Memorial Library, named after the college's third master, opened as an extension to Holgate House in 2005.

Buildings

There are four accommodation blocks on site: Hollingside (the main building), Elvet, Oswald and Holgate House. Grey was the first college in Durham to have all of its bedrooms connected to the university computer network. The college offers a number of other facilities: Hollingside contains the 350-seat dining room (the college is fully catered), the college bar and the Junior Common Room (JCR), which has the largest TV of any Durham college, while Holgate House has a conference centre and a library with over 7,000 books. A fifth building, Fountains Hall, is the home of Phoenix Theatre Company (PTC), and also contains the college chapel, a multi-purpose hall (for everything from badminton to band practice), and a toastie bar. 

The University Botanic Garden and the High Wood are located next door to the college, and a path leads directly to the Science Site.

College life
Notable social events include the fireworks display (the largest in Durham - cancelled in 2017 due to no longer being commercially viable) "The Informal Ball" with its fancy dress themes; and "Grey Day", a mix of fun events on the lawn and college bands, traditionally accompanied by the consumption of alcohol. The year comes to an end with "The Phoenix Ball", the largest and most lavish social event of the year.

Grey has a large number of sports clubs, ranging from Grey College Boat Club through Grey College Ultimate Frisbee Club to team croquet. Many of Grey's sporting clubs have enjoyed success in recent years, notably the women's hockey team, boat club, darts team, rugby team, football team, cheerleading squad and Ultimate Frisbee Club.

Members of the college sometimes refer to themselves as the "Grey Army" and can be found at many college sporting events (usually rugby games) supporting the team, with a "Commander-in-Chief" appointed by the JCR each academic year to lead the troops. Another mascot of the college is the "College Trout"—a Big Mouth Billy Hamill toy that is currently stationed behind the bar. A bi-annual magazine, Grey Matter, also exists to satirise college events.

Grey also has termly art exhibitions which were developed by alumnus Henry Dyson. One such was 'My Mining Days' by Tom Lamb which gave an insight into the experience and culture of mining within the area.

The college has a fellowship in mathematics (the Alan David Richards Fellowship) and a general fellowship scheme (the Sidney Holgate Fellowships), which includes funding for research fellows and an artist in residence.

Notable students

 Heidi Alexander – BA Geog., MA – Labour MP for Lewisham East
 Adam Applegarth – BA Maths and Economics – Chief executive, Northern Rock (2001–07)
 Daniel Casey – BA English Literature – Co-star of Midsomer Murders, Casualty
 Peter Dixon – England Rugby Union Captain 1971
 Alan Greaves – archaeologist, University of Liverpool
 Chris Higgins – academic, Vice Chancellor of Durham University 2007 – 2014
 James Kirkup FRSLit – BA – travel writer, poet, novelist, playwright, translator, broadcaster, Hon. Fellow Grey College from 1992
 Nish Kumar – BA History – Comedian
 Dominic Montserrat – BA Egyptology – TV egyptologist
 John A. Pyle CBE FRS – BSc Physics – Atmospheric Scientist. Head of Chemistry Department at The University of Cambridge 
 Tim Stimpson – BA Anthropology (1995) – Rugby Union player and England international (1996–2002)
 Major General John Sutherell - British Army Officer who served in the SAS. 
 The Rt Revd Rob Wickham - BA Geography - Anglican Bishop of Edmonton from 2015 and sometime part-time as Acting Bishop of Portsmouth.
 James Wilby – BSc Maths. – film, television and theatre actor
 David Williams F.R.S. – 1960-62 – Mathematician, formerly Professor of Mathematical Statistics, University of Cambridge
 The Rt Revd Paul Gavin Williams – BA Hons Theol. (1989) – Bishop of Kensington, from 2015 Bishop of Southwell.

Fellows
 Rabbi Lionel Blue – Rabbi, broadcaster, author and Honorary Doctor of Divinity & Fellow at Grey College
 Sir Reresby Sitwell, 7th Baronet – Hon. Fellow from 2001

Masters
The current master of the college is Thomas Allen, professor at Durham Law School.
Sidney Holgate (1959 to 1980)
Eric Halladay (1980 to 1988)
Victor Watts (1988 to 2002)
J. Martyn Chamberlain (2002 to 2011)
 Thomas Allen (2011 to present)

References

Further reading

 Watson, Nigel. (2004) From the Ashes: The Story of Grey College, Durham. London: James & James Ltd.

External links
Grey College official website
Grey College Association alumni organisation website

Colleges of Durham University
Educational institutions established in 1959
1959 establishments in England
Grey College, Durham